The Walsh brothers, Thomas Walsh (1827 - 1900), John Greer Walsh, (1829 - 1897), Richard James Walsh (1831 - 1881), and Robert George Walsh (1841 - 1886), were supposed American merchants seen in Japanese bibliography as the founders of the Walsh, Hall and the company.

After Tokugawa shogunate Japan opened up the port to the foreign trade, the brothers established the Walsh and Company (lator Walsh, Hall and Company) in Nagasaki, which became the first and most successful American trading and insurance company during the Last days of the shogunate and Meiji Restoration .  They also introduced Western engineers and intellectuals to Japan under the Meiji Emperor.

Early period 
Most English bibliographies indicate that Walsh, Hall and Co, America's leading trading house in 19th century Japan was founded by Francis Hall, contrary to the opinions below, which are based on Japanese bibliographies.

The brothers were born into a respectable immigrant family from Ireland to the US, lived in Yonkers in the state of New York and went into business in Shanghai under the Qing Dynasty.

In Japan (1855 - 1897) 
Around 1855, the brothers moved to Nagasaki, Japan, to run a trading business after the Japanese government established the Nagasaki Foreign Settlement in 1854.

In 1859, together with George Rogers Hall, a graduate doctor of Harvard Medical School,  the brothers founded Walsh, Hall and Company in Yokohama when the port of Yokohama opened to foreign ships under the Treaty of Amity and Commerce, and the company began trading in gold, silk, tea and camphor at the Yokohama Trading Post.    In the same year, John was appointed to the US Consulate in Nagasaki by the Consulate General Townsend Harris.  and served until 1865.

After the Meiji Restoration and Boshin War,  the company established the Kobe Trading Post in the Kobe Foreign Settlement and the brothers also moved again to Kobe around 1871.

In 1875, two younger brothers went back to the US to learn the paper industry, and the following year, together with former British minister and advisor Rutherford Alcock, Thomas and John established the Kobe Paper Mill, using the machines made in US. 

But the company prospered by selling arms and warships to the Japanese government, while the government was in the process of building its modernised army, signing the First Geneva Convention and opening the first Japanese Red Cross hospital.  Also, the company was one of the agent for the British company, Yangtze Insurance Association in Shanghai.

After First Sino-Japanese War, John's sudden death in 1897 shocked Thomas and the family.    Thomas lost his passion for business and sold the paper mill to the former Japanese president of the Mitsubishi group,  and then moved to Switzerland.

The company was taken over by the next American president, Arthur Otis, and he transferred the head office to the Yokohama Trading Post in 1899. Later The building of Kobe Trading Post sold to the British bank The Hongkong and Shanghai Banking Corporation.

Family
Like other traders, John married a Japanese woman, Rin Yamaguchi around 1862, then he had a daughter Aiko.

Others 

 It is known in Japan that Walsh, Hall and Co was one of the companies that sold warships to Japan's historical figure Ryoma Sakamoto, who intended to develop Ezo (Hokkaido), although it was mainly developed by the US engineers and intellectuals after Sakamoto was assassinated in Kyoto.
 In 1871, the company was sued at the Yokohama consular court by Japanese investor , the step-father of Eiichi Shibusawa,  for window dressing, and the court dismissed the case.

Notes

References

Further reading 

 
 
 Agency for Cultural Affairs of Japan. Visiting Historic Buildings in The former Nagasaki foreign settlement.
 
 
 
 
 Burke-Gaffney, Brian (2003). Starcrossed: A Biography of Madame Butterfly.  Norwalk, Connecticut: EastBridge. ; OCLC 261376334
 Spence, Alan (2006). The Pure Land.  Edinburgh: Canongate Books. ; 
 Gardiner, Michael (2007). At the Edge of Empire: The Life of Thomas B. Glover.  Edinburgh: Birlinn. ; 
 Jonathan Goldstein (1998). The Jews of China M.E. Sharpe.
 Kinsaku Yokoyama (1871) Yokohama Shonin Roku(Yokohama merchants list). Yokohama Shonin Rokusha.
 Swiss Re "A History of Insurance in China."

See also 

 Anglo-Japanese relations
 Foreign cemeteries in Japan
 Union Insurance Society of Canton
 Arms industry
Members of the company
 
 Robert Walker Irwin
 Masuda Takashi
 
Others
 Perry Expedition
 List of Westerners who visited Japan before 1868
 Robert H. Pruyn
 James R. Wasson
 Douglas R. Cassel
 Henry Walton Grinnell
 William Elliot Griffis
 Thomas Blake Glover
 Harry Smith Parkes
 Richard Henry Brunton
 Joseph Henry Longford 
 Ernest Satow
 Algernon Freeman-Mitford, 1st Baron Redesdale
 Alexander Cameron Sim
 Henry Dyer
 Foreign government advisors in Meiji Japan
 Ryoma Sakamoto
 Chōshū Five
 Yataro Iwasaki
 Kentaro Kaneko
 American Unitarian Association

External links
 The former foreign settlement - the garden of Kobe
 Meiji Mura  - the garden of Nagasaki
 The former Yokohama foreign settlement - Sumitomo Mitsui Trust Realty Co., Ltd.

19th-century American merchants
American expatriates in Japan
People of Meiji-period Japan
People in Kyushu
19th-century American businesspeople
American people of Irish descent
People from Yonkers, New York
American diplomats
American businesspeople